The Conn Smythe Trophy is awarded annually to the most valuable player (MVP) of his team during the National Hockey League's (NHL) Stanley Cup playoffs. It is named after Conn Smythe, the longtime owner, general manager, and head coach of the Toronto Maple Leafs. The Conn Smythe Trophy has been awarded 54 times to 47 players since the 1964–65 NHL season. Each year, at the conclusion of the final game of the Stanley Cup Finals, members of the Professional Hockey Writers' Association vote to elect the player deserving of the trophy. The trophy is handed out by the NHL Commissioner before the presentation of the Stanley Cup and only the winner is announced, in contrast to most of the other NHL awards which name three finalists and are presented at a ceremony. Vote tallies for the Conn Smythe Trophy were released starting in 2017.

Unlike the playoff MVP awards presented in the other major professional sports leagues of the United States and Canada (the Super Bowl MVP, the NBA Finals MVP, the MLS Cup MVP and the World Series MVP), the Conn Smythe is based on a player's performance during the entire NHL postseason instead of just the championship game or series.

The most recent winner is Cale Makar.

History
The Conn Smythe Trophy was introduced in 1964 by Maple Leaf Gardens Limited to honor Conn Smythe, the former owner, general manager and coach of the Toronto Maple Leafs and a member of the Hockey Hall of Fame as a builder. The centerpiece of the trophy is a stylized silver replica of Maple Leaf Gardens, the arena built under Smythe's ownership of the Maple Leafs, and their home from 1931 to 1999. Backing the arena replica is a large silver botanically-accurate maple leaf. The arena replica and leaf are set atop a square wooden foundation, the front of which bears a dedication plaque. Additional tiers below the foundation, sloping outward, contain maple leaf-shaped plates bearing the inscriptions of the winners' names.

The base of the Conn Smythe Trophy has been expanded twice over the years to accommodate more winners. Although the 16 nameplates on the original base tier were filled up after 1980, a new tier was not added until the 1983–84 season. Following the 2000 Stanley Cup playoffs, the 20 nameplates on the new tier were filled up, so the first nine winners' nameplates were moved up to the remaining three sides of the foundation tier, with the remaining nameplates shifted accordingly to keep the winners in chronological order. Due to the cancellation of the 2004–05 season, the trophy was not filled up again until 2010, after which a new tier was added, making room for 24 more names.

The first winner of the trophy was center Jean Beliveau of the Montreal Canadiens in 1965. The first player and only defenseman to win it twice was Bobby Orr, who scored the Cup-clinching goals for the Boston Bruins in 1970 and 1972. Goaltender Bernie Parent (for the Philadelphia Flyers) and centers Wayne Gretzky (for the Edmonton Oilers), Mario Lemieux, and Sidney Crosby (for the Pittsburgh Penguins) have also won it twice each, with Parent, Lemieux, and Crosby each winning theirs back to back (1974/1975, 1991/1992, and 2016/2017 respectively). Goaltender Patrick Roy is the only player to win the trophy three times, and also the only player to win it as a member of two different teams (with the Canadiens in 1986 and 1993, and with the Colorado Avalanche in 2001); his wins also fall into three different decades. Ken Dryden, the 1971 Smythe winner, is the only NHL player to win this trophy before winning the Calder Trophy as rookie of the year (in 1972): Montreal called him up to play only six regular season games, which is not enough to qualify as a rookie season. Dave Keon is the only Maple Leafs player to win the trophy donated by his club's parent company, while his eight playoff points in 1967 is the fewest ever by a non-goalie Conn Smythe winner as he was a defensive forward.

Though the trophy rewards a player who performed particularly well over the entirety of the playoffs, it has never been given to a player whose team did not at least reach the Stanley Cup Finals. The trophy has been awarded to members of the team that lost the Finals five times, most recently Jean-Sebastien Giguere of the Mighty Ducks of Anaheim in 2003, who backstopped his team's surprise run to the Finals, where they pushed the New Jersey Devils to seven games. The only skater to win the award in a losing effort is Philadelphia's Reggie Leach, who won it in 1976 as he had set a league record for most goals in the playoffs (19), which included a five-goal game in the semifinals and four goals in the Finals, even though the Canadiens swept his Flyers.

Only ten players born outside of Canada have won the Conn Smythe Trophy. The non-Canadian winners are Americans Brian Leetch, who won it in 1994, Tim Thomas in 2011, Jonathan Quick in 2012, and Patrick Kane in 2013; Russians Evgeni Malkin, Alexander Ovechkin and Andrei Vasilevskiy who won it in 2009, 2018 and 2021, respectively; and Swedes Nicklas Lidstrom, Henrik Zetterberg and Victor Hedman, who won it in 2002, 2008 and 2020, respectively.

Only three players have won the Conn Smythe Trophy and the Hart Memorial Trophy for Most Valuable Player during the regular season in the same year: Orr in 1970 and 1972, Guy Lafleur in 1977 and Wayne Gretzky in 1985. These three players also won the Art Ross Trophy as regular season leading scorer, while Orr also won the James Norris Memorial Trophy as top defenceman to give him a record four individual original NHL awards in 1970.

As of 2019, the Conn Smythe Trophy has been awarded to centers 19 times, to goaltenders 17 times, to defencemen ten times, and to right wingers seven times, while the only left wingers to have won the award are Bob Gainey of Montreal in 1979 and Alexander Ovechkin of Washington in 2018. The Montreal Canadiens have received the most Conn Smythe Trophies with nine. The Detroit Red Wings and Pittsburgh Penguins have each received five, and the Edmonton Oilers, Philadelphia Flyers, and New York Islanders have each received four.

Winners

By position
Conn Smythe Trophy winners by position

See also
List of National Hockey League awards
List of Stanley Cup champions
List of NHL statistical leaders

References

General
Conn Smythe Trophy at NHL.com
Conn Smythe Trophy history at HHOF.net

Specific

National Hockey League trophies and awards
Awards established in 1964
Most valuable player awards